The 2017 Campeonato Paraibano de Futebol was the 107th edition of Paraíba's top professional football league. The competition  began on 8 January and ended on 7 May. Botafogo-PB were champions, after defeating Treze in the final.

Format
The competition is divided into two stages.

In the first stage, the ten teams will play each other home and away, for a total of eighteen games.

In the final stage, the top four teams from the first stage will play a semi-final over two legs. The first ranked team will play the fourth ranked team and the second ranked team will play the third ranked team. The higher ranked team will play at home in the second leg in both cases. The winners of these ties will play the final over two legs.

Qualification
The two finalists qualified to participate in the 2018 Copa do Brasil and 2018 Copa do Nordeste. The two best placed teams (other than Botafogo-PB) qualified to participate in the 2018 Campeonato Brasileiro Série D.

Participating teams

First stage

Standings

Knockout stage

References

Paraíba
2017